Johns Mountain is a mountain located in the Catskill Mountains of New York northeast of Wittenberg. Beetree Hill is located west, and Mount Tobias is located west-northwest of Johns Mountain.

References

Mountains of Ulster County, New York
Mountains of New York (state)